The following is a list of notable people who were born in the Croatian town of Zadar. Zadar natives are referred to as Zadrani. For people born in Zadar County, see List of people from Zadar County.

People from Zadar

A
 Ingrid Antičević-Marinović (born 1957), lawyer, politician, Minister of Justice, Public Administration and Local Self-government, justice of the Constitutional Court

B
 Silvio Ballarin (1901 – 1969), mathematician and university professor
 Juraj Baraković (1548–1628), poet
 Nikola Bašić (born 1946), architect
 Saša Bjelanović (born 1979), football player
 Sava Bjelanović (1850–1897), politician and journalist
 Zoran Bujas (1910–2004), psychiatrist
 Ante Bukvić, football player
 Marijan Buljat (born 1981), football player

C
 Tullio Carminati (1894–1971), actor
 Stefan Cebara (born 1991), professional soccer player
 Andrea Cippico (1877–1935), Italian senator
 Arturo Colautti (1851–1914), journalist, polemicist and librettist
 Igor Crnadak (born 1972), politician
 Branko Culina (born 1957), football player and trainer
 Čika (died 1095), founder of the Benedictine monastery of St. Mary
 Hrvoje Ćustić (1983–2008), football player

D
 Renzo de' Vidovich (born 1934), politician, historian and journalist
 Vladan Desnica (1905–1967), writer
 Valter Dešpalj (born 1947), cellist and music professor
 Natali Dizdar (born 1984), singer
 Donatus of Zadar, Catholic saint and bishop

G
 Giorgio da Sebenico (1410–1475), sculptor and architect
 Gjon Rënësi, Albanian rebel (1567-1624)
 Mladen Grdović (born 1958), singer

H
 Helen of Zadar (?-976), queen consort of the Kingdom of Croatia

I
 Tomislav Ivčić (1953–1993), singer and composer

J
 Jakov Varingez (c. 1400 – 1485), blessed of the Roman Catholic Church, patron of the Italian town of Bitetto
 Toni Jeričević (born 1983), businessman, actor, TV host
 Joanna II of Naples (1373–1435),  Queen of Naples
 Pope John IV (died 12 October 642) reigned from 24 December 640 to his death in 642.

K
 Pavle Kalinić (born 1959), politician and writer
 Božidar Kalmeta (born 1958), politician and Mayor of Zadar
 Tomislav Karamarko (born 1959), politician and First Deputy Prime Minister of Croatia
 Brne Karnarutić (1515–1573), poet
 Emilija Kokić (born 1968), singer
 Marie Kraja (1911–1999), opera singer
 Ante Krapić (born 1985), basketball player

L
 Boris Labar (born 1947), physician and scientist in the field of hematology and hematopoietic stem cell transplantation
 Francesco Laurana (1430–1502), sculptor and architect
 Luciano Laurana (c. 1420 – 1479), architect and engineer
 Tihana Lazović (born 1990), actress

M
 Oliver Maric (born 1981), football player
 Stelvio Mestrovich (born 1958), writer, musicologist, and critic
 Luka Modrić (born 1985), football player

N
 Antun Nalis (1911–2000), actor

P
 Pier Alessandro Paravia (1797–1857), writer, scholar, philanthropist and professor of Italian eloquence
 Bernarda Pera (born 1994), tennis player
 Joseph Plachutta (1827–1883), chess player
 Herdi Prenga (born 1994), football player
 Zoran Primorac (born 1969), table tennis player
 Dado Pršo (born 1974), football player

R
 Ivana Radovniković (born 1985), singer

S
 Andrea Schiavone (c. 1510/1515–1563), painter
 Mima Simić (born 1976), writer, film critic, translator, LGBT activist
 Velimir Škorpik, Yugoslav Partisan commander
 Tamara Šoletić (born 1965), actress
 Simone Stratigo (1733–1824), mathematician and a nautical science
 Jovan Sundečić (1825–1900), poet, Orthodox Christian priest, secretary of Prince Nikola I of Montenegro
 Ivan Santini (born 1989), football player

T
 Carlo Tivaroni (1843–1906), historian and politician
 Enrico Tivaroni (1841–1925), Italian senator and magistrate
 Georg von Trapp (1880–1947), K.u.K. Submarine commander and father of "singing Trapp family"

V
 Jakov Varingez (1400–1496), Roman Catholic professed religious of the Order of Friars Minor
 Vekenega (died 1111), abbess of the Benedictine monastery of St. Mary
 Vladimir Velebit (1907–2004), Yugoslav People's Army Major-General, lawyer, historian, diplomat
 Giorgio Ventura (c. 1570 – c. 1610), painter
 Dalibor Veselinović (born 1987), football player
 Jeronim Vidulić (c. 1430 – 1499), poet

W
 Felix Weingartner (1863–1942), composer

Z
 Anđeo Lovrov Zadranin, 14th-century architect
 Juraj Lovrov Zadranin, 14th-century architect
 Luigi Ziliotto, politician, podestà of Zadar (Zara) (1863–1922)
 Ksenija Zečević (1956–2006), pianist and composer
 Petar Zoranić (c. 1508, died 1543–1569), writer
 Katija Zubčić (born 1958), actress

References

 
Zadar